State Road 570 (SR 570), also known as the Polk Parkway, is a , limited-access toll road which runs through Polk County, Florida. It is operated as part of Florida's Turnpike Enterprise system of limited-access expressways. The Polk Parkway mainly serves as a beltway around Lakeland forming a semicircle, which along with I-4 circumscribes most of the city limits of Lakeland.

As part of Florida's Turnpike network, SunPass, E-Pass, and LeeWay electronic toll collection were recognized along with coin collection at toll plazas and interchange ramps.  The Polk Parkway didn't, however, employ open road tolling like numerous other toll roads in Florida until on September 23, 2022, at 8:00 pm, when it went to all-electronic tolling, like the other toll roads within the network.

Route description
SR 570 provides easier access to I-4 from Polk County cities Lakeland, Winter Haven, Bartow, Mulberry, and Auburndale, as well as providing quick routes from city to city. The road is signed east–west, although the section from SR 540 (exit 14) to the eastern I-4 junction runs nearly south to north. The control cities for the highway's signage are Tampa (westbound) and Orlando (eastbound). As of 2015, the toll is $1.25 cash or $1.06 with SunPass at the three mainline toll plazas and $0.00-0.75 cash or $0.00-$0.53 with SunPass at junctions. The maximum toll for any trip along the Polk Parkway is $3.75 cash or $3.18 with SunPass.

The Polk Parkway begins at Interstate 4 near the Hillsborough-Polk County line west of Lakeland. Until reaching Harden Boulevard (exit 5), the Polk Parkway passes through mostly undeveloped land. Just east of Airport Road (exit 3), the highway passes a large building with a green glass facade, which is the corporate headquarters for Publix Supermarkets. Before reaching exit 4, the highway runs a half mile northeast of Lakeland Linder International Airport—a large general aviation airport—passing beneath the path of air traffic on Runway 5/23. Between Harden Boulevard (exit 5) and South Florida Avenue (exit 7), the Polk Parkway was built along the alignment of Drane Field Road, which is now truncated at Harden Boulevard and continues to South Florida Avenue as frontage roads along the Polk Parkway. The first mainline toll plaza is located between South Florida Avenue and Lakeland Highlands Road. The eastbound exit and westbound entrance at SR 540 (exit 14) are located at the Central Toll Plaza. After crossing De Castro Road, the Polk Parkway curves to the north, passing the only operating landfill in Polk County. Along the curve is the westbound exit and eastbound entrance of the SR 540 junction, which is the location of the planned interchange with the future Central Polk Parkway. The Polk Parkway continues north for the remainder of its length. A  segment between Old Dixie Highway and Pace Road is a two-lane highway; the only overpass along this segment was built to accommodate a second carriageway west of the current highway. About midway between Old Dixie Highway and Pace Road is the Eastern Toll Plaza. The Pace Road interchange collects tolls with SunPass only and was added to the highway in 2011 to provide access to Florida Polytechnic University, located on the southwest corner of the I-4/Polk Parkway interchange.

History

The Polk Parkway was originally conceived in the 1950s as a circumferential route around Lakeland, and after several delays in planning due to funding shortfalls, it was revived as the Imperial Parkway by the Polk County Commission in 1986.  Due to the delays, a proposal in the 1970s/1980s that would have connected the parkway with the Lee Roy Selmon Expressway never came to fruition.  In the spring of 1990, the Florida Legislature led by Senate leader and Winter Haven resident Bob Crawford, incorporated the Polk Parkway into the Turnpike Expansion Program, a part of Senate Bill 1316.
 
The Parkway's groundbreaking was on January 25, 1996. The western  of the Parkway opened to traffic on August 9, 1998. The easternmost  of road opened to traffic on 12 December 1999, completing the highway at a cost of $490 million.

In the late summer of 2009, the Turnpike began widening the Polk Parkway from Interstate 4 at Polk City south to Pace Road from two lanes to four lanes.  This $48 million design-build project includes construction of a SunPass-only interchange at Pace Road (exit 23), featuring a modified cloverleaf design, with a 25 cent toll for the to-and-from the east (north) movement.  The to-and-from the west (south) movement is not tolled as there is a mainline plaza to the west where the toll will be collected.  The interchange opened on November 10, 2011, providing access to the new Florida Polytechnic University campus.  The project is a public-private partnership between the Florida Department of Transportation—Florida’s Turnpike Enterprise, USF Polytechnic, the Polk County Board of County Commissioners and The Williams Company.

The 1998 Florida Legislature designated the western  of the Polk Parkway (between Interstate 4 and South Florida Avenue (State Road 37) as the James Henry Mills Medal of Honor Parkway.  Mills was the only native of Polk County to receive a medal of honor in World War II, in recognition of his heroic actions in Cisterna, Italy.

Future
The Polk Parkway has become an important part of Polk County's transportation infrastructure as traffic has increased in the growing county.

There have been several plans presented to the public regarding a proposed Heartland Parkway which would be a roughly  parkway extending from the Polk Parkway to Southwest Florida near Ft. Myers.

There has also been a proposal to construct an extension from the Polk Parkway encircling Winter Haven and connecting with I-4 near the Polk-Osceola county line. Another proposed parkway would connect the southeast corner of the Polk Parkway with State Road 60 east of Lake Wales. These will be realized as the Central Polk Parkway (SR 570B), which is currently in the design phase.

Exit list

References

External links

 Florida's Turnpike Enterprise (official site)
 Map of Polk Parkway/SR 570
 Florida Department of Transportation (official site)
 SunPass

570
570
570
Florida State Road 570
Freeways in the United States
Lakeland, Florida